Echinodorus longiscapus is a perennial, aquatic plant of the Alismataceae, native to South America (Brazil, Paraguay, Uruguay and Argentina). It is cultivated as a pond or aquarium plant.

Description
Leaves long-petioled, petioles 1.5 - 3 x longer than the blades. Blades oval, ovate or cordate, at the tip obtuse or shortly acuminate, at the base lobate or abrupt, 9 – 11 cm long x 7 – 8 cm wide, in the terrestrial forms often only 3 cm long x 2 cm wide. Submersed blades oval or ovate, often nearly rounded. Blades trimmed with pellucid lines to 2 mm long. Stem erect, longer than the leaves, glabrous or rarely scabrous, 30 – 80 cm long. Inflorescence racemose having 3 - 9 whorls containing 6 - 12 flowers each, proliferous. Bracts as long as the pedicels, or hardly longer, to 1.5 cm long, having 9 - 11 ribs and membraneous margins. Pedicels usually 1 - (2.5) cm long, sepals 5 – 6 mm long having 16 - 20 undistinct ribs, petals white, 1.7 – 2 cm long, corolla 2.5 – 4 cm in diameter. Stamens 20 - 25, anthers as long as the filaments, pistils numerous. Aggregate fruit globular or ovate, 5 – 7 mm in diameter. Achenes 2 - 2.3 mm long x 0.9 – 1 mm wide having usually 4 lateral ribs and (1) - 3 glands placed in a row in the upper half of the body. Beak erect or bent, 0.5 mm long.

Cultivation
Propagated by division or adventitious plantlets. Seeds germinate freely. Easy to cultivate and seems to withstand a wide range of water conditions and temperatures.

References

External links
 South American distribution

longiscapus
Flora of Brazil
Flora of Paraguay
Flora of Uruguay
Flora of Argentina
Plants described in 1902
Freshwater plants